Time's Up is the second and final studio album by American rapper K-Solo. It was released on June 2, 1992 via Atlantic Records. Production was handled by Sam Sneed, EPMD, Pete Rock and K-Solo. The album peaked at number 135 on the Billboard 200, at number 36 on the Top R&B/Hip-Hop Albums and at number 3 on the Heatseekers Albums in the United States.

Tha album spawned two singles: "I Can't Hold It Back" and "Letterman", both were charted on the Hot Rap Songs chart.

Track listing

Charts

References

External links

1992 albums
K-Solo albums
Atlantic Records albums
Albums produced by Pete Rock
Albums produced by Sam Sneed
Albums produced by Erick Sermon